Lommatzsch is a municipality located in the district of Meißen in the Free State of Saxony, Germany.

Geography 
Lommatzsch lies amidst the so-called Lommatzscher Pflege, an area of land featuring high quality loessic soil and therefore mainly used agriculturally.

Subdivisions
Albertitz, Altlommatzsch, Altsattel, Arntitz, Barmenitz, Birmenitz, Churschütz, Daubnitz, Dennschütz, Dörschnitz, Grauswitz, Ickowitz, Jessen, Klappendorf, Krepta, Lautzschen, Löbschütz, Lommatzsch, Marschütz, Mögen, Neckanitz, Paltzschen, Petzschwitz, Piskowitz, Pitschütz, Poititz, Prositz, Rauba, Roitzsch, Scheerau, Schwochau, Sieglitz, Striegnitz, Trogen, Wachtnitz, Weitzschenhain, Wuhnitz, Zöthain, Zscheilitz.

History 
The town's name is derived from the West Slavic Glomacze tribe (Daleminzier in German), who settled here around 800 C.E. at the Glomuci sanctuary, a now dry lake north of the town. Lommatzsch in the Margraviate of Meissen was first mentioned in a 1286 deed. On 12 August 1330, the Wettin margrave Frederick I ceded to the Meissen burgrave the tax receipts from the Lommatzsch citizens for having the right to brew beer. A mayor and a board was mentioned in 1386, the council's constitution of 1412 ordered a mayor and 9 boardmembers. In 1423 Lommatzsch with the Meissen margraviate was merged into the Electorate of Saxony under Wettin rule.

The current Saint Wenceslaus parish church was erected from 1504 onwards, three Gothic spikes were set on the tower of a predecessor building and a nave was added. The town became Protestant in 1539, when Ambrosius Naumann became first Evangelical pastor. The town hall in its current size was erected from 1550 to 1555, and the Saint Wenceslaus Church received its first tower clock in 1591. In 1607 and 1611 the town was heavily affected by plague epidemics, leaving 1350 dead, soon followed by the destructive Thirty Years' War: after Elector John George I of Saxony had sided with King Gustavus Adolphus of Sweden, Lommatzsch was burnt down in 1632 by Albrecht von Wallenstein's Imperial troops and again in 1645, after the Elector had switched sides, by Swedish forces under General Lennart Torstenson. Nevertheless, Saxony rose quickly after the war. Under Elector Frederick Augustus I, a Saxon stagecoach milestone was erected on the market square.

People

Honorary citizens 
 Robert Volkmann, (1815-1883), composer

 Carl Menzel, (1844-1923), entrepreneur for the production of glas
 Gerhard Menzel, (1911-1997), entrepreneur
 Terence Hill, (born 1939), film star, spent part of his childhood in Lommatzsch, due to his mother coming from Saxony.

Sons and daughters of the town 
 Hans Fährmann (1860-1940), composer and organist
 Reiner Frieske (born 1940), handball goalkeeper
 Horst Frank (1942-1962) died at the Berlin Wall

References 

Meissen (district)